Diaspore , also known as diasporite, empholite, kayserite, or tanatarite, is an aluminium oxide hydroxide mineral, α-AlO(OH), crystallizing in the orthorhombic system and isomorphous with goethite. It occurs sometimes as flattened crystals, but usually as lamellar or scaly masses, the flattened surface being a direction of perfect cleavage on which the lustre is markedly pearly in character. It is colorless or greyish-white, yellowish, sometimes violet in color, and varies from translucent to transparent. It may be readily distinguished from other colorless transparent minerals with a perfect cleavage and pearly luster—like mica, talc, brucite and gypsum— by its greater hardness of 6.5–7. The specific gravity is 3.4. When heated before the blowpipe it decrepitates violently, breaking up into white pearly scales.

The mineral occurs as an alteration product of corundum or emery and is found in granular limestone and other crystalline rocks. Well-developed crystals are found in the emery deposits of the Urals and at Chester, Massachusetts, US and in kaolin at Schemnitz in Hungary. If obtainable in large quantity, it would be of economic importance as a source of aluminium.

Diaspore, along with gibbsite and boehmite, is a major component of the aluminium ore bauxite.

It was first described in 1801 for an occurrence in Mramorsk Zavod, Sverdlovskaya Oblast, Middle Urals, Russia. The name, which was coined by René Just Haüy, is from the Greek for διασπείρειν, to scatter, in allusion to its decrepitation on heating.

Csarite™, ottomanite, Turkizite and zultanite® are trade names for gem-quality diaspore (also known as Turkish diaspore) from the İlbir Mountains of southwest Turkey.

References

Aluminium minerals
Hydroxide minerals
Orthorhombic minerals
Minerals in space group 62